The Mesilla Valley AVA is an American Viticultural Area located primarily in the state of New Mexico with a small area in the state of Texas.  Spanish explorer Don Juan de Oñate arrived in the area in 1598 and named a Native American village in the valley Trenquel de la Mesilla, from which the valley as a whole became known as Mesilla Valley.  Although viticulture began in nearby El Paso as early as 1650, grapes were first planted in the Mesilla Valley only in the early twentieth century, near the town of Doña Ana.  The climate in the Mesilla Valley is dry and hot.

See also

General
 New Mexico wine
 Texas wine
Wineries
 La Viña Winery
 St. Clair Winery

References

American Viticultural Areas
Geography of New Mexico
Geography of Texas
New Mexico wine
Texas wine
1985 establishments in New Mexico
1985 establishments in Texas